Coleophora campella is a moth of the family Coleophoridae. It is found in Turkestan and Uzbekistan.

The larvae feed on Salsola gemmascens. The entire development takes place inside the fruit of their host plant. The larvae are chocolate-brown or ocher-yellow, with a more or less discernible chocolate-brown band in the middle of each segment. The head is brown. The larvae can be found from the end of September to October.

References

campella
Moths described in 1973
Moths of Asia